Nicholas James Culkin (born 6 July 1978) is a former English footballer who played as a goalkeeper.

Career
Born in York, North Yorkshire, Culkin signed for Premier League club Manchester United in September 1995, costing £100,000 from York City while still in the club's youth system. He made his Manchester United debut on their tour of Scandinavia prior to the 1998–99 season, coming on for Peter Schmeichel at half-time in their game against Norwegian side SK Brann; Culkin kept a clean sheet as United won 4–0. He signed a new two-year contract with United in May 1999.

He holds the record for the shortest debut in Premier League history, replacing Raimond van der Gouw in stoppage time against Arsenal at Highbury on 22 August 1999, the referee blew up right after Culkin took the resulting free kick. Culkin also received two Charity Shield runners-up medals as he appeared on the bench in the 1998 and 1999 Charity Shields.

He was also loaned to Hull City, Bristol Rovers and Livingston. After leaving Manchester United, he signed for QPR. Overall, he played 93 league matches, three FA Cup matches, and seven League Cup matches. Culkin retired from professional football in April 2005 due to a long-standing knee injury.

Culkin came out of retirement after signing for Northern Premier League Division One North team Radcliffe Borough in August 2010. During the 2011–12 season, Culkin was placed in the NPL First Division North team of the Year, and was nominated for the Fans Player of the Year, losing out to Cheyenne Dunkley. He has also been voted the Supporters Player of the year on two occasions and the Club's Player of the Year in 2012. He remained at the club until October 2012.

He joined Prescot Cables in November.

In March 2014 he joined FC United of Manchester.  He then joined on for the 2014–15 season. This earned him the record of becoming the first player to appear for both Manchester United and FC United.

Career statistics

References

External links

Profile at StretfordEnd.co.uk

1978 births
Living people
Footballers from York
English footballers
Association football goalkeepers
York City F.C. players
Manchester United F.C. players
Hull City A.F.C. players
Bristol Rovers F.C. players
Livingston F.C. players
Queens Park Rangers F.C. players
Radcliffe F.C. players
Premier League players
English Football League players
Scottish Premier League players
Northern Premier League players
Prescot Cables F.C. players
F.C. United of Manchester players